Mario Esteban Bergara Duque (born 4 May 1965 in Montevideo) is a Uruguayan economist, public accountant, professor and politician of the Broad Front. He served as President of the Central Bank of Uruguay from 2008 to 2013 and from 2015 to 2018. He also served as Minister of Economy and Finance (2013-2015) and as Deputy Minister of Economy and Finance (2005-2008). Since February 15, 2020, he has served as Senator of the Republic for the 49th Legislature.

Biography

Education 
Bergara graduated as an Economist (1987) and Public Accountant (1990) at the University of the Republic. He later obtained an MA (1997) and a PhD (1998) in Economics at the University of California, Berkeley.

Career 
He worked at the Banco de la República and at the Banco Central. He was head of the Department of Economic Studies of the Central Bank from 2001 to 2005 he was director of the Communications Services Regulatory Unit. Bergara's beginnings in the Broad Front were as a member of the Communist Party, but later, with his breakup from 1989 and upon returning from his graduate studies in the US, he frequented the surroundings of one of its founders, Líber Seregni. During the General's last years of life, he became one of his trusted men. After the electoral victory of Tabaré Vázquez in the 2004 elections, he was appointed Deputy Minister of Economy and Finance, accompanying Minister Danilo Astori.

He resigned his position in the ministry at the same time that Danilo Astori did. On November 11, 2008, he assumed as President of the Central Bank of Uruguay, a position he held until December 26, 2013. In that moment he was appointed Minister of Economy and Finance, replacing Fernando Lorenzo. He returned to the post of president of the Central Bank in April 2015.

Participation in elections 
In 2019, Bergara was a candidate in the Broad Front primaries election. However, he was defeated by Daniel Martínez, who represented the party in the general election of the same year. After the primary result of the primary elections Bergara obtained a total vote of 23,688 corresponding to 9.28% of the total votes received by the Broad Front.

In the 2019 general election, he was elected Senator of the Republic for the 49th Legislature, a position he accessed on February 15, 2020.

Personal life 
Bergara maintains a relationship with the journalist and anchorperson Blanca Rodríguez.

Bibliography

References

External links 
 CV of Mario Bergara, PhD

1965 births
People from Montevideo
University of the Republic (Uruguay) alumni
UC Berkeley College of Letters and Science alumni
Uruguayan economists
Broad Front (Uruguay) politicians
Presidents of the Central Bank of Uruguay
Ministers of Economics and Finance of Uruguay
Living people